Actress Mare Winningham has received many awards and nominations for her acting work. She was nominated for an Academy Award for Best Supporting Actress for her supporting role as Georgia Flood in the 1995 film Georgia. She received critical acclaim for this role and was nominated for a Screen Actors Guild Award for Outstanding Performance by a Female Actor in a Supporting Role and also won the Independent Spirit Award for Best Supporting Female. She is known for her multiple supporting and guest roles on television, and starring in numerous miniseries; which have earned Winningham two Primetime Emmy Awards for Outstanding Supporting Actress in a Miniseries or a Movie for her performance in Amber Waves (1980) and George Wallace (1997).

She has also received recognition for her contributions to the theatre, having been nominated for Tony Awards in 2014 and 2022, and a Drama Desk Award in 2008.

Film awards

Academy Awards

Genie Awards

Independent Spirit Awards

Screen Actors Guild Awards

Television awards

Golden Globe Awards

Primetime Emmy Awards

Satellite Awards

Screen Actors Guild Awards

Theatre awards

Drama Desk Awards

Lucille Lortel Awards

Tony Awards

References

External links
 

Winningham, Mare